Home Folks is a 1912 black and white silent drama film directed by D. W. Griffith and starring Mary Pickford and Mae Marsh.

Cast

References

External links
 

American silent short films
American black-and-white films
Silent American drama films
1912 drama films
1912 films
Films directed by D. W. Griffith
Films with screenplays by Frank E. Woods
Biograph Company films
General Film Company
1910s American films